Intermuscular septums of the leg may refer to:

 Anterior intermuscular septum of leg, or anterior crural intermuscular septum is a band of fascia which separates the lateral from the anterior compartment of leg
 Deep transverse fascia, also known as transverse intermuscular septum of leg
 Posterior intermuscular septum of leg, or posterior crural intermuscular septum is a band of fascia which separates the lateral compartment of leg.